The 2020 UCI Europe Tour was the sixteenth season of the UCI Europe Tour. The 2020 season began on 25 January 2020 with the GP Belek and ended on 14 October 2020 with the Scheldeprijs.

Throughout the season, points are awarded to the top finishers of stages within stage races and the final general classification standings of each of the stages races and one-day events. The quality and complexity of a race also determines how many points are awarded to the top finishers, the higher the UCI rating of a race, the more points are awarded.

The UCI ratings from highest to lowest are as follows:
 Multi-day events: 2.Pro, 2.1 and 2.2
 One-day events: 1.Pro, 1.1 and 1.2

Events

January

February

March

April–June
No race were held due to the COVID-19 pandemic.

July

August

September

October

References

External links
 

 
UCI Europe Tour
UCI Europe Tour
UCI
UCI Europe Tour